Fray Jorge Airport,  is an airstrip  west of Ovalle, a city in the Coquimbo Region of Chile.

Terrain rises to the west.

See also

Transport in Chile
List of airports in Chile

References

External links
OpenStreetMap - Fray Jorge Airport
OurAirports - Fray Jorge Airport
FallingRain - Fray Jorge Airport

Airports in Coquimbo Region